Phil Grindrod  born 1907, died 1967 was a British cinematographer.

Selected filmography
 The Indiscretions of Eve (1932)
 His Wife's Mother (1932)
 A Southern Maid (1933)
 The Great Defender (1934)
 Love at Second Sight (1934)
 Give Us the Moon (1944)
 I'll Be Your Sweetheart (1945)
 George in Civvy Street (1946)
 This Man Is Mine (1946)
 Dusty Bates (1947)
 The Clouded Crystal (1948)
 A Boy, a Girl and a Bike (1949)
 My Wife's Lodger (1952)
 My Death Is a Mockery (1952)
 Is Your Honeymoon Really Necessary? (1953)
 Confession (1955)
 Port of Escape (1956)
 The Key Man (1957)
 The Diplomatic Corpse (1958)
 Violent Moment (1959)
 A Question of Suspense (1961)
 The Telegoons (1963)

References

External links
 

Year of birth unknown
1963 deaths
British cinematographers